889 Erynia  is a highly elongated background asteroid from the inner regions of the asteroid belt. It was named from Greek mythology, after the Erinyes, also known as Furies.

Orbit and classification 

Erynia is a non-family asteroid of the main belt's background population when applying the hierarchical clustering method to its proper orbital elements. It orbits the Sun in the inner asteroid belt at a distance of 2.0–2.9 AU once every 3 years and 10 months (1,398 days; semi-major axis of 2.45 AU). Its orbit has an eccentricity of 0.20 and an inclination of 8° with respect to the ecliptic. The body's observation arc begins at Heidelberg Observatory on 16 March 1918, or elven nights after its official discovery observation.

Naming 

This minor planet was named after one of the Erinyes from Greek mythology, also known as Furies in Roman mythology. The female deities of vengeance have snakes for hair, dog's heads, coal black bodies, bat's wings, and blood-shot eyes. They tortured their victims with brass-studded scourges and inflicted plagues. The  was mentioned in The Names of the Minor Planets by Paul Herget in 1955.

Physical characteristics 

In the Tholen-like taxonomy of the Small Solar System Objects Spectroscopic Survey (S3OS2), Erynia is a common stony S-type asteroid, while in the SMASS-like taxonomic variant of the survey, it is an Sl-subtype, which transitions from the S- to the uncommon L-type.

Rotation period and poles 

In January 2002, a rotational lightcurve of Erynia was obtained from photometric observations by French astronomer Laurent Bernasconi. Lightcurve analysis gave a rotation period of  hours with a high brightness variation of  magnitude, indicative of a non-spherical, elongated shape. A concurring period of  hours and an amplitude 0.47 magnitude was obtained by astronomers at the Palomar Transient Factory in April 2010. In 2011, a modeled lightcurve using data from the Uppsala Asteroid Photometric Catalogue (UAPC) and other sources gave a sidereal period  hours, as well as two spin axes at (187.0°, −60.0°) and (335.0°, −74.0°) in ecliptic coordinates (λ, β).

Diameter and albedo 

References

External links 
 Lightcurve Database Query (LCDB), at www.minorplanet.info
 Dictionary of Minor Planet Names, Google books
 Asteroids and comets rotation curves, CdR – Geneva Observatory, Raoul Behrend
 Discovery Circumstances: Numbered Minor Planets (1)-(5000) – Minor Planet Center
 
 

000889
Discoveries by Max Wolf
Named minor planets
19180305